Kigirktaryuk Island is an island located inside western Coronation Gulf, south of Victoria Island, in the Kitikmeot Region, Nunavut, Canada.
Other islands in the vicinity include Blaze Island, Onitkok Island, Seven Mile Island, as well as the Berens Islands, Couper Islands, Deadman Islands, Nichols Islands, Sir Graham Moore Islands. The community of Kugkluktuk (formerly Coppermine) is located on the mainland,  to the southwest.

References

Islands of Coronation Gulf
Uninhabited islands of Kitikmeot Region